Shake Rag was an unincorporated community in Chickasaw County, Mississippi.

References

Unincorporated communities in Chickasaw County, Mississippi
Unincorporated communities in Mississippi